Bibiana Rodríguez Montes (born 13 March 1969) is a Mexican politician from the National Action Party. In 2009 she served as Deputy of the LX Legislature of the Mexican Congress representing Querétaro.

References

1969 births
Living people
People from Querétaro
Women members of the Chamber of Deputies (Mexico)
National Action Party (Mexico) politicians
Politicians from Querétaro
21st-century Mexican politicians
21st-century Mexican women politicians
Deputies of the LX Legislature of Mexico
Members of the Chamber of Deputies (Mexico) for Querétaro